Gerard Holohan (born 5 September 1947) is the bishop of the Roman Catholic Diocese of Bunbury and currently, the longest serving Latin Rite bishop in Australia as of 2022.

Early life
Holohan was born and baptised on the 5th September 1947. He was educated by the Sisters of Mercy at Our Lady Help of Christians Primary School in Perth, and by the Christian Brothers, first at St Francis Xavier College and then at Trinity College.

He entered St Charles Seminary Guildford in 1965 for philosophical studies, and then moved to St Francis Xavier Seminary, Adelaide in 1968 to study theology.

Priesthood
Holohan was ordained to the priesthood on 4 September 1971 by Perth Archbishop Launcelot Goody. He was initially appointed to serve in the Cottesloe parish before serving in the parish of Subiaco until 1975.

Archbishop Goody asked him to spend his ministry in Catholic education and between 1975 and 1981, he completed postgraduate degrees in Education and Arts at Murdoch University in Perth, and Fordham University in the United States. In 1980, he became chaplain and religious education coordinator at Newman College, Churchlands and in 1981, he was appointed Director of Religious Education. He also served as Governor of the University of Notre Dame Australia.

He became an affiliated member of the Marist Brothers Order in 1990.

Episcopacy
Holohan was appointed as Bishop of Bunbury by Pope John Paul II on 11 June 2001, replacing Bishop Peter Quinn who retired in 2000. He was ordained a bishop and installed on 5 September 2001, becoming the fourth Bishop of Bunbury.

References

External links

21st-century Roman Catholic bishops in Australia
Roman Catholic bishops of Bunbury
Living people
1947 births